Anti-Mexican sentiment, a form of Hispanophobia, is prejudice, fear, or hatred towards Mexico and people of Mexican descent, Mexican culture and/or Mexican Spanish and it is most commonly found in the United States.

Its origins in the United States date back to the Mexican and American Wars of Independence and the struggle over the disputed Southwestern territories. That struggle would eventually lead to the Mexican–American War in which the defeat of Mexico caused a great loss of territory. In the 20th century, anti-Mexican sentiment continued to grow after the Zimmermann Telegram, an incident between the Mexican government and the German Empire during World War I.

Throughout US history, negative stereotypes have circulated regarding Mexican Americans and often reflected in film and other media.

1840s-1890s

As the result of the Texas Revolution and Texas Annexation, the US inherited the Republic of Texas's border disputes with Mexico, which led to the eruption of the Mexican–American War (1846–1848). After the defeat of Mexico, it was forced to sign the Treaty of Guadalupe Hidalgo. The treaty required Mexico to cede almost half its land to the United States in exchange for 15 million dollars but also guaranteed that Mexican citizens living in ceded lands would retain full property rights and be granted US citizenship if they remained in the ceded lands for at least one year. The treaty and others led to the establishment in 1889 of the International Boundary and Water Commission, which was tasked with maintaining the border, allocating river waters between the two nations, and providing for flood control and water sanitation.

The lynching of Mexicans and Mexican Americans in the Southwest has long been overlooked in US history. That may be because the Tuskegee Institute files and reports, which contain the most comprehensive lynching records in the US, categorized Mexican, Chinese, and Native American lynching victims as white. Statistics of reported lynching in the United States indicate that between 1882 and 1951, 4,730 persons were lynched, 1,293 of whom were white and 3,437 black. The actual number of Mexicans lynched is unknown. William D. Carrigan and Clive Webb estimate that between 1848 and 1928, at least 597 Mexicans were lynched, of which 64 in areas that lacked a formal judicial system. One particularly infamous lynching occurred on July 5, 1851, when a Mexican woman, Josefa Segovia, was lynched by a mob in Downieville, California. She was accused of killing a man who had attempted to assault her after he had broken into her home.

Law enforcement conducted a considerable amount of these murders; therefore, the malefactors seldom stood trial for lynching Mexican people. Mexicans were lynched for various reasons such as job competition, speaking Spanish too loudly in a public setting, romantically advancing towards white women, reminding the Anglo system of the cultural difference, and much more.

1900s-1920s

The Bisbee Deportation was the illegal deportation of about 1,300 striking mine workers, supporters, and citizen bystanders by 2,000 vigilantes on July 12, 1917. The workers and others were kidnapped in the town of Bisbee, Arizona, and held at a local baseball park. They were then loaded onto cattle cars and transported 200 miles (320 km) for 16 hours through the desert without food or water. The deportees were unloaded at Hermanas, New Mexico, without money or transportation and were warned not to return to Bisbee.

In 1911, a mob of over 100 people hanged a 14-year-old boy, Antonio Gómez, after he was arrested for murder. Rather than let him serve time in jail, townspeople lynched him and dragged his body through the streets of Thorndale, Texas.

Between 1910 and 1919, Texas Rangers were responsible for the deaths of hundreds to thousands of ethnic Mexicans in South Texas. The violence continued through the Porvenir Massacre on January 28, 1918, when Texas Rangers summarily executed 15 Mexicans in Presidio County, Texas.  This caused State Representative José Canales to head an investigation into systematic violence against Mexicans by the Texas Rangers, which largely ended the pattern of violence and led to the dismissal of five rangers involved in the massacre.

1930s
The Mexican American community has been the subject of widespread immigration raids. During the Great Depression, the US government sponsored Mexican Repatriation programs, which were intended to pressure people to move to Mexico, but many were deported against their will. 355,000 to 500,000 individuals were repatriated or deported; 40 to 60% of them US citizens - overwhelmingly children.
In 1936, Colorado even ordered all of its "Mexicans," in reality, anyone who spoke Spanish or seemed to be of Latin descent, to leave the state, and it blockaded its southern border to keep people from leaving. Though no formal decree was ever issued by immigration authorities, Immigration and Naturalization Service officials helped the expulsions.

1940s

According to the National World War II Museum, between 250,000 and 500,000 Hispanic Americans served in the United States Armed Forces during World War II and comprised 2.3% to 4.7% of the Army. The exact number, however, is unknown as Hispanics were then classified as whites. Generally, Mexican American World War II servicemen were integrated into regular military units. However, many Mexican–American War veterans were discriminated against and even denied medical services by the US Department of Veterans Affairs when they arrived home. In 1948, the war veteran Dr Hector P. Garcia founded the American GI Forum (AGIF) to address the concerns of Mexican American veterans who were being discriminated. The AGIF's first campaign was on the behalf of Felix Longoria, a Mexican American private who was killed in the Philippines in the line of duty. Upon the return of his body to his hometown of Three Rivers, Texas, he was denied funeral services because he was Mexican American.

In the 1940s, imagery in newspapers and crime novels portrayed Mexican American zoot suiters as disloyal foreigners or murderers attacking non-Hispanic white police officers and servicemen. Opposition to zoot suiters sparked a series of attacks on young Mexican American males in Los Angeles, which became known as the Zoot Suit Riots. The worst of the riots occurred on June 9, 1943 during which 5,000 servicemen and residents gathered in Downtown Los Angeles and attacked Mexican Americans, only some of whom were zoot suiters. The rioting eventually spread to the predominantly African-American neighborhood of Watts.

In Orange County, California, Mexican American school children were subject to racial segregation in the public school system and forced to attend "Mexican schools." In 1947, Mendez v. Westminster was a ruling that declared that segregating children of "Mexican and Latin descent" in state-operated public schools in Orange County was unconstitutional. That helped lay the foundation for the landmark Brown v Board of Education, a case that ended racial segregation in the public schools.

1950s–1960s

In many counties in the southwestern United States, Mexican Americans were not selected as jurors in court cases that involved a Mexican American defendant. In 1954, Pete Hernandez, an agricultural worker, was indicted of murder by a jury that was all non-Hispanic white in Jackson County, Texas. Hernandez believed that the jury could not be impartial unless members of other races were allowed on the jury-selecting committees and noted a Mexican American had not been on a jury for more than 25 years in that particular county. Hernandez and his lawyers decided to take the case to the US Supreme Court. The Hernandez v. Texas ruling declared that Mexican Americans and other cultural groups in the United States are entitled to equal protection under the Fourteenth Amendment of the US Constitution.

Many organizations, businesses, and homeowners associations had official policies to exclude Mexican Americans. In many areas across the Southwest, Mexican Americans lived in separate residential areas because of laws and real estate company policies. The group of laws and policies, known as redlining, lasted until the 1950s and fell under the concept of official segregation.

1970s
One of the most vicious cases occurred at the U.S.-Mexico border west of Douglas, Arizona, on August 18, 1976, when three Mexican campesinos who had crossed the border illegally, were attacked while they were crossing a ranch belonging to Douglas dairyman George Hanigan. The three were kidnapped, stripped, hogtied, and had their feet burned before they were cut loose and told to run back to Mexico. As the three men ran, the Hanigans shot birdshot into their backs. The three made it back across the border to Agua Prieta, Sonora, where the local police notified the Mexican consulate in Douglas, which lodged formal complaints against George Hanigan and his two sons.  George Hanigan died of a heart attack at the age of 67 on March 22, 1977, one week before he and his sons were scheduled to go on trial.
After three trials, one of the Hanigan sons was convicted in federal court and sentenced to three years, and the other was found not guilty.

1980s–1990s
In 1994, California state voters approved Proposition 187 by a wide majority. The initiative made undocumented immigrants ineligible for public health (except for emergencies), public social services, and public education. It required public agencies to report anyone they believed to be undocumented to either the INS or the California attorney general. It made it a felony to print, sell, or use false citizenship documents. Many Mexican Americans opposed such measures as reminiscent of ethnic discrimination before the Civil Rights Era and denounced the actions as illegal under state and federal laws, as well as international law involving the rights of foreign nationals in other countries. The initiative was eventually declared unconstitutional by the Ninth Circuit Court of Appeals in San Francisco.

21st century

As of July 2018, 37.0 million Americans, or 10.3% of the United States' population, identify themselves as being of full or partial Mexican ancestry; that was 61.9% of all Hispanics and Latinos in the United States. The US is home to the second-largest Mexican community in the world, second only to Mexico itself, and is over 24% of the entire Mexican-origin population of the world (Canada is a distant third with a small Mexican Canadian population of 96,055 or 0.3% of the population as of 2011). In addition, approximately 7,000,000 Mexicans lived undocumented in the United States in 2008. In 2012, the United States admitted 145,326 Mexican immigrants, and 1,323,978 Mexicans were waiting for a slot to open so that they could emigrate to the United States. A 2014 survey indicated that 34% of all Mexicans would immigrate to the United States if they could do so.

Some private citizen groups have been established to apprehend immigrants crossing undocumented into the United States. Such groups, like the Minuteman Project and other anti-immigration organizations, have been accused of discrimination because of their aggressive and illegal tactics.

As Mexicans make up most Latinos in the United States, when the non-Latino population is asked to comment on their perception of Latinos, it tends to think of stereotypes of Mexicans that are fueled by the media, which focus on undocumented immigration. In a 2012 survey conducted by the National Hispanic Media Coalition, one-third of non-Hispanic Americans (Whites, Blacks, and Asians) falsely believed that most of the nation's Hispanics were "illegal immigrants with large families and little education." The report has been criticized on the grounds that it makes the same mistake as the media in aggregating all Latinos into a single group, which misses both the diversity of the situations of the different groups and the varying perceptions of those groups by the non-Latino population.

From 2003 to 2007 in California, the state with the largest Mexican and Mexican American population, the number of hate crimes against Mexicans almost doubled. Anti-Mexican feelings are sometimes directed also against other Latino American nationalities even though anti-Mexican sentiment exists in some Caribbean and Latino groups.

Additional incidents
 
In July 2008, Luis Ramirez, a Mexican undocumented immigrant, was beaten to death by several young men in Shenandoah, Pennsylvania, while he was walking home one evening. Witnesses reported that the assailants yelled racial epithets at Ramirez as they attacked him. His non-Hispanic white fiancée and the mother of his two children, Crystal Dillman, was quoted as saying of the four teenagers, "I think they might get off, because Luis was an illegal Mexican and these are 'all-American boys' on the football team who get good grades, or whatever they're saying about them. They'll find some way to let them go." Brandon Piekarsky, 17, and Derrick Donchak, 19, received sentences of 7 to 23 months for their roles in the murder of 25-year-old Mexican immigrant. Piekarsky and Donchak were later convicted of civil rights violations in federal court and sentenced to 9 years in federal prison.

In 2008, Rodolfo Olmedo, a Mexican, was dragged down by a group of men shouting anti-Mexican epithets and bashed over the head with a wooden stick on the street outside his home, the first of 11 suspected attacks that year motivated by anti-Hispanic bias in the neighborhood of Port Richmond, Staten Island. The area is predominantly African American but has seen a large influx of Mexican immigrants. Four African-American teens, Rolston Hopson, William Marcano and Tyrone Goodman, all age 17, and Ethan Cave, age 15, were charged in the assault.  They all took plea bargains: Hopson plead guilty  to second-degree robbery; Goodman and Marcano plead guilty to attempted third-degree robbery, and Cave plead guilty to third-degree robbery.

Although the US Border Patrol is predominantly Latino (According to 2016 data, Latinos constitute slightly more than 50% of the Border Patrol), In July 2019, more than 60 border patrol agents were investigated over their participation in a Facebook page that mocked migrants.  

Organizations including neo-Nazi, white supremacist, American nationalist, and nativist groups have all been recently known to intimidate, harass, and advocate the use of violence against Mexican Americans.

A domestic terrorist attack/mass shooting occurred on August 3, 2019 at a Walmart store in El Paso, Texas, and resulted in 23 people dead and 23 injured, 18 of which were Hispanic Americans and/or Mexicans. The suspect, Patrick Crusius, told El Paso Police that he was trying to kill as many Mexicans as possible. In a manifesto, The Inconvenient Truth, published on 8chan just before the attacks, Crusius had cited several white nationalist beliefs such as a supposed "Hispanic invasion of Texas" and The Great Replacement conspiracy theory; stated that he was "simply trying to defend my country from cultural and ethnic replacement brought on by an invasion" (white genocide conspiracy theory), environmental degradation; contempt towards corporations, and their use of automation to replace workers. Crusius said that he was inspired in part by the Christchurch mosque shootings.

See also
 History of Hispanic and Latino Americans in the United States
 History of Mexican Americans
 Nativism (politics) in the United States#Hispanic targets
 Racism in the United States#Hispanic and Latino Americans
 Anti-Chilean sentiment
 Anti-Venezuelan sentiment
 Hispanophobia
 Madrigal v. Quilligan

References

External links

Racism
 
Mexican
Stereotypes of Hispanic and Latino people